The defending champion was Zina Garrison, but lost in the semifinals to Manuela Maleeva. Martina Navratilova won the title, defeating Maleeva in the final, 6–3 6–2.

Seeds

Draw

Finals

Top half

Bottom half

References

External links 
 ITF tournament edition details

Virginia Slims of Chicago
Ameritech Cup
Virginia Slims of Chicago